Osinovka is a rural locality (a selo) and the administrative centre of Osinovsky Selsoviet, Birsky District, Bashkortostan, Russia. The population was 980 as of 2010. There are 14 streets.

Geography 
Osinovka is located 16 km southeast of Birsk (the district's administrative centre) by road. Dubrovka is the nearest rural locality.

References 

Rural localities in Birsky District